Die Rebellie van Lafras Verwey, is a 2017 South African biographical drama film directed by Simon Barnard and co-produced by Katinka Heyns and Genevieve Hofmeyr for Sonneblom Films and Moonlighting Films. The film stars Tobie Cronje in lead role along with Chantell Phillipus, Neels van Jaarsveld and Cobus Visser in supportive roles.

The film describes the life and career of Lafras Verwey who worked as a clerk in the Civil Service in Pretoria for thirty years. The film received positive reviews and won several awards at international film festivals.

Plot
 Tobie Cronje as Lafras Verwey
 Chantell Phillipus as Petra
 Neels van Jaarsveld as Die Agent
 Cobus Visser as Louw
 Albert Pretorius as Leon Nell
 Brendon Daniels as George
 Duke Motlanthe as William
 Slindile Nodangala as Eunice Magobe
 Albert Maritz as Seremoniemeester
 Marna Gey van Pittius as Suster
 Lionel Newton as Sersant Chapman
 Pietman Geldenhuys as Henry
 Ghapi as Drummer
 Dina Fisher as Sus
 Gavin van den Berg as Man by Skyfskietstalletjie

References

External links
 
 Die Rebellie van Lafras Verwey on YouTube

2017 films
2017 drama films
South African drama films
Afrikaans-language films
English-language South African films
2010s English-language films